Coleophora tanyleuca is a moth of the family Coleophoridae. It is found in Mauritania and Tunisia. The larvae feed on the leaves of Cytisus sessilifolius.

References

tanyleuca
Moths described in 1936
Moths of Africa